The 2003–04 Israel State Cup (Gvia HaMedina) was the 65th season of Israel's nationwide football cup competition and the 50th after the Israeli Declaration of Independence.

The competition was won by Bnei Sakhnin who had beaten Hapoel Haifa 4–1 in the final. This is the first time the cup was won by a club from an Israeli Arab town.

By winning, Bnei Sakhnin qualified to the 2004–05 UEFA Cup, entering in the second qualifying round.

Results

Eighth Round

Round of 16

Quarter-finals

Semi-finals

Final

References
100 Years of Football 1906–2006, Elisha Shohat (Israel), 2006, p. 322
Israel Cups 2003/04 RSSSF

Israel State Cup
State Cup
Israel State Cup seasons